The 2016 Central Oklahoma Bronchos football team represented the University of Central Oklahoma in the 2016 NCAA Division II football season. The Bronchos played their home games since 1965 at Wantland Stadium in Edmond, Oklahoma. 2016 was the 110th season in school history. The Bronchos were led by fifth-year head coach, Nick Bobeck. Central Oklahoma has been a member of the Mid-America Intercollegiate Athletics Association since 2012.

Preseason
The Bronchos entered the 2016 season after finishing 7–5 overall, 6–5 in conference play last season under Bobeck. On August 2, 2016 at the MIAA Football Media Day, the Bronchos were chosen to finish in fifth place in the Coaches Poll, and sixth in the Media Poll.

Personnel

Coaching staff
Along with Bobeck, there were 9 assistants.

Roster

Schedule

Source:

Game summaries

Lindenwood

Pittsburg State

Fort Hays State

Missouri Western

Emporia State

Northwest Missouri State

Nebraska–Kearney

Missouri Southern

Central Missouri

Wasburn

Northeastern State

References

Central Oklahoma
Central Oklahoma Bronchos football seasons
Central Oklahoma Bronchos football